İrem Damla Şahin (born 2 February 2000) is a Turkish women's football goalkeeper currently playing in the Turkish Women's First Football League for Konak Belediyespor in İzmir with jersey number 30. She was a member of the Turkey women's national U-19 team.

Playing career

Club
İrem Damla Şahin obtained her license on 4 June 2015 from her hometown club Yenimahalle 52 Spor, which is also known as Soyaspor Gençlik. She debuted in the Turkish Women's Third League on 8 November 2015. Aftercapping 50 times in three seasons in her hometown Ordu, she moved to İzmir to join the First League team Konak Belediyespor in the 2018–19 season.

She was named the "Best Goalkeeper" of the Turkish Girls' Championship in 2018.

International
Şahin was admitted to the Turkey women's national under-19 football team, and debuted in the friendky match against Poland on 30 August 2018. She took part in one match of the qualifying round, and two matches of the Elite round at the 2019 UEFA Women's Under-19 Championship qualification.

Career statistics
.

Honours

Club
 Turkish Women's First League
 Konak Belediyespor
 Third places (1): 2018–19

Individual
 Best Goalkeeper, 2018 Turkish Girls' Championship

References

External links

Living people
2000 births
Sportspeople from Ordu
Women's association football goalkeepers
Turkish women's footballers
Konak Belediyespor players